Antonín Přidal (13 October 1935, Prostějov, Czechoslovakia – 7 February 2017, Brno, Czech Republic) was a Czech translator from English, Spanish and French, and writer, journalist and university lecturer.

Life
He attended grammar school in Uherské Hradiště. After graduation, he studied, from 1953 to 1958, English and Hispanic Studies at Masaryk University in Brno. In 1982, he received his doctorate.

He collaborated with Czech Radio in Brno from 1960 to 1970. There, he was the author of cycles and a small school of poetry, Shakespeare for beginners and ramblings about books and music, and the co-author of the show See you on Saturday. From the late 1960s are particularly important his radio play All my votes and the Fates. He briefly worked as a script editor at Barrandov Studios from 1990 to 1991.

Subsequently, he worked at the Theatre Faculty of Janáček Academy of Music and Performing Arts (since 1991 as an associate professor and since 1993 as a professor) in the studio of radio and television drama and screenwriting.

In 1998, he received the Prize of Ferdinand Peroutka. In 2007, he was awarded the State Prize for translation work.

He died on 7 February 2017, as announced by the Theatre faculty of the Janáček Academy of Music and Performing Arts.

Works
Přidal is a noted author of Czech radio play. His most notable works include Všechny moje hlasy (1967) and Sudičky (1968). Brno-based publisher Větrné issued, in 2006, a selection of his four radio and theatre plays: Políček č. 111, Atentát v přízemí, Noční žokej, Elektrický nůž, and Noc potom.

In the early nineties, he was also the author and presenter of the TV series Klub Netopýr and Z očí do očí.

He also wrote essays and philosophical works. In 2008, Second City Committee published of his texts - mostly anonymous - Kouzlo nechtěného. The committee also came out with texts from his radio series Potulky knihami a časem (Barrister and Principal, 2011). In 2015, he published a collection of poems, Zpovědi a odposlechy.

His translations provided Czech readers with English and Spanish writings of poetry and drama. He translated a number of major prose works of modern English and American literature. The translated books were usually enriched with comprehensive commentary. He is known especially his translation of Leo Rosten's O K*A*P*L*A*N! My K*A*P*L*A*N!.

References

External links
 List of works the Catalogue of the CR, whose author or topic is Antonín Přidal

1935 births
2017 deaths
Masaryk University alumni
Writers from Prostějov
Academic staff of the Janáček Academy of Music and Performing Arts
Translators to Czech
20th-century Czech dramatists and playwrights
Czech journalists
Czech translators
Czech male dramatists and playwrights
20th-century translators